Fallon National Wildlife Refuge is a National Wildlife Refuge of the United States located in western Nevada. It was established in 1931 as a refuge and breeding ground for birds and other wild animals.

This area, in the Lahontan Valley, is at the terminus of the Carson River. In years of high water flows down the river, the refuge is important for migratory shorebirds and waterfowl. However, due to diversions, in most years there is not enough flow for the river to even reach the refuge lands.

The refuge is open 7 days a week, 24 hours a day, but there are no facilities on the refuge. Roads are primitive and passable only during those periods of dry weather.

References
Refuge website

National Wildlife Refuges in Nevada
Protected areas established in 1931
Protected areas of Churchill County, Nevada
Wetlands of Nevada
Landforms of Churchill County, Nevada